In stratigraphy and geology, an eonothem is the totality of rock strata laid down in the stratigraphic record deposited during a certain eon of the continuous geologic timescale. The eonothem is not to be confused with the eon itself, which is a corresponding division of geologic time spanning a specific number of (hundreds of millions of) years, during which rocks were formed that are classified within the eonothem.  Eonothems have the same names as their corresponding eons, which means during the history of the Earth only four eonothems were formed. Oldest to newest these are the Hadean, Archean, Proterozoic, and Phanerozoic. A rock stratum, fossil or feature present in the "upper Phanerozoic" eonothem would therefore have originated within the "later Phanerozoic" eon. In practice, the rock column is discontinuous: 

Eonothems, despite discontinuities (locally missing strata or unconformities), can be compared to others where the rock record is more complete and, by correlation of points of correspondence, be fixed appropriately within the eon. They are therefore useful as broad chronostratigraphic units, specifying approximate age within the timelines within the rock column. 

Eonothems are subdivided into erathems and their smaller subdivisions within geology and paleobiology and their sub-fields, and a whole system of cross-disciplinary classification by strata is in place with oversight by the International Commission on Stratigraphy.

Eonothems are not often used in practice as expert dating estimates can be and usually are specified into the more refined timelines of smaller chronostratigraphic units, which can be subdivided in turn down to the many defined stages, the smallest formally recognised units used in dating. (see the hierarchy of comparative units, five each for time division types and five for the rock record types.)

Dating standards
Global Standard Stratigraphic Ages (GSSAs) are defined by the International Commission on Stratigraphy and are used primarily for time-dating rock layers older than 630 million years ago (mya), before a good fossil record exists.

For more recent periods, a Global Boundary Stratotype Section and Point (GSSP), largely based on research progress in geobiology and improved methods of fossil dating is used to define such boundaries.  In contrast to GSSAs, GSSPs are based on important events and transitions within a particular stratigraphic section.  In older sections, there is insufficient fossil record or well preserved sections to identify the key events necessary for a GSSP so GSSAs are defined based on fixed dates.

Etymology

Eonothem derives from eon, “age”, a Latin transliteration from the koine Greek word  (ho aion) from the archaic   (aiwon), and thema, "that which is placed or laid down", "subject of a discourse".

See also

Multidiscipline comparison

Chronostratigraphy
Lithostratigraphy
Geologic record

Related other topics
 Body form
 Fauna (animals)
 Type locality

Notes

References
 Hedberg, H.D., (editor), International stratigraphic guide: A guide to stratigraphic classification, terminology, and procedure, New York, John Wiley and Sons, 1976
 International Stratigraphic Chart from the International Commission on Stratigraphy
 USA National Park Service
 Washington State University
 Web Geological Time Machine
 Eon or Aeon, Math Words - An alphabetical index

External links
The Global Boundary Stratotype Section and Point (GSSP): overview
Chart of The Global Boundary Stratotype Sections and Points (GSSP): chart
Geotime chart displaying geologic time periods compared to the fossil record.

Chronostratigraphy
.
Geochronology
Geologic time scales
Geology terminology
Geological units

es:Eratema